The FIBA Oceania Championship for Men 2005 was the qualifying tournament of FIBA Oceania for the 2006 FIBA World Championship. Australia won all three games. Both teams qualified for the 2006 FIBA World Championship.

Teams that did not enter

Venues

Results

References
FIBA Archive

FIBA Oceania Championship
Championship
2005 in New Zealand basketball
2005–06 in Australian basketball
International basketball competitions hosted by New Zealand
Australia men's national basketball team games
New Zealand men's national basketball team games